Noel Guillen (15 December 1926 – 4 June 1987) was a Trinidadian cricketer. He played in three first-class matches for Trinidad and Tobago from 1951 to 1959.

See also
 List of Trinidadian representative cricketers

References

External links
 

1926 births
1987 deaths
Trinidad and Tobago cricketers